Tom Reynolds  (9 August 1866 in London, England – 25 July 1942) was a British actor.

Selected filmography
 The Lyons Mail (1916)
 Onward Christian Soldiers (1918)
 A Member of Tattersall's (1919)
 The Right Element (1919)
 Mrs. Thompson (1919)
 The Winning Goal (1920)
 Aunt Rachel (1920)
 The Husband Hunter (1920)
 The Pride of the Fancy (1920) - Professor Ruston
 The Last Rose of Summer (1920) - Palliser
 Tilly of Bloomsbury (1921)
 The Magistrate (1921)
 For Her Father's Sake (1921)
 Mr. Pim Passes By (1921)
 The Game of Life (1922)
 A Bachelor's Baby (1922)
 The Knockout (1923)
 A Royal Divorce (1923)
 The Cost of Beauty (1924)
 She (1925)
 Birds of Prey (1930)

Death 
Tom Reynolds died on 25 July 1942, aged 75

References

External links

1866 births
1942 deaths
English male film actors
English male silent film actors
People from Paddington
20th-century English male actors